Kjell Svestad  is a Norwegian handball player. He made his debut on the Norwegian national team in 1957, 
and played 59 matches for the national team between 1957 and 1967. He participated at the 1958, 1961, 1964, and 1967 World Men's Handball Championship.

References

Living people
Norwegian male handball players
1932 births